First Presbyterian Church is a historic Presbyterian church at 325 Elm Street in Idaho Falls, Idaho.  It was built during 1918 to 1920 and was added to the National Register in 1978.

It was deemed architecturally significant as "a good example of the Neo-classical revival style"; its "dome and Ionic portico are impressive by Idaho's standards."

It is the only building in Idaho designed by Uniontown, Pennsylvania ecclesiastic architect J. C. Fulton.

References

Presbyterian churches in Idaho
Churches on the National Register of Historic Places in Idaho
Neoclassical architecture in Idaho
Churches completed in 1918
Churches in Bonneville County, Idaho
National Register of Historic Places in Bonneville County, Idaho
Buildings and structures in Idaho Falls, Idaho
Neoclassical church buildings in the United States